Margaret Maron (née Brown; August 25, 1938 – February 23, 2021) was an American writer, the author of award-winning mystery novels.

Biography
Maron was born in Greensboro, North Carolina and grew up in central Johnston County; she had also lived in Italy. She and her husband, artist Joe Maron, lived in Brooklyn before returning to her home state in 1972. Maron died of complications from a stroke.

Career

Writing
Maron was the author of numerous short stories and more than 20 mystery novels to date. One series of novels features Sigrid Harald, a loner lieutenant in the NYPD whose policeman father was killed in the line of duty when she was a toddler (The Right Jack: a Sigrid Harald Mystery). Another series follows the adventures of Judge Deborah Knott, attorney and daughter of an infamous North Carolina bootlegger.

Her works have been translated into a dozen languages and are on the reading lists of many courses in contemporary Southern literature, as well as Crime and Mystery literature courses.

Professional activities
Maron was a founding member and past president of Sisters in Crime and of the American Crime Writers' League, and a director on the national board for Mystery Writers of America. She was a keynote speaker at the Great Manhattan Mystery Conclave in 2004.

Awards and recognition
Maron received a number of awards for her work from the various awarding bodies of the mystery fiction genre.

Her first novel to receive recognition was Corpus Christmas, which was nominated for the 1989 Agatha Award and the 1990 Anthony Award in the "Best Novel" category. Her first short story to be met with critical acclaim was "Deborah's Judgment", which won the 1991 Agatha Award and was also nominated for the Anthony Award and the Macavity Award the following year for "Best Short-story".

Her novel Bootlegger's Daughter was very well received, winning the 1992 Agatha and the Anthony, Edgar and Macavity awards for "Best Novel" the following year. Additionally in 1993, Marons short story "...That Married Dear Old Dad" was nominated for the "Best Short-story" Agatha and her novel Southern Discomfort was nominated for the "Best Novel" Agatha award. Southern Discomfort was again honoured the following year, picking up a nomination at the 1994 Anthony Awards, again for "Best Novel".

Up Jumps The Devil won the 1996 "Best Novel" Agatha Award; two years later her novel Home Fires was nominated for this same honour, as well as a Macavity nomination in 1999. 2000 brought yet another Agatha Award nomination for Storm Track. Short story "Virgo in Sapphires" was nominated for the 2001 Agatha, the 2002 Edgar and the 2002 Anthony Awards in the "Best Short-story" category; the latter being the same year that another of her short-stories, "The Dog That Didn't Bark", won the Agatha Award.

Last Lessons of Summer  was nominated for an Agatha Award in 2003; High Country Fall was nominated for an Agatha Award in 2004 and also picked up a Macavity nomination the following year, the same year in which her novel Rituals of the Season picked up yet another Agatha nomination. Hard Row also received an Agatha Award nomination, this time in 2007. Three-Day Town won the 2011 Agatha Award for "Best Novel".

Maron received an honorary doctorate from and gave the commencement address to the University of North Carolina at Greensboro in May 2010, where she was a student for two years. In 2016, she was inducted into the North Carolina Literary Hall of Fame.

Bibliography

Judge Deborah Knott series
Bootlegger's Daughter, 1992
Southern Discomfort, 1993
Shooting at Loons, 1994
Up Jumps the Devil, 1996
Killer Market, 1997
Home Fires, 1998
Storm Track, 2000
Uncommon Clay, 2001
Slow Dollar, 2002
High Country Fall, 2004
Rituals of the Season, 2005
Winter's Child, 2006
Hard Row, 2007
Death’s Half-Acre, 2008
Sand Sharks, 2009
Christmas Mourning, 2010
Three-Day Town, 2011 (cross-over with Sigrid Harald)
The Buzzard Table, 2012
Designated Daughters, 2014
Long Upon the Land, 2015

Sigrid Harald series
One Coffee With, 1981
Death of a Butterfly, 1984
Death in Blue Folders, 1985
The Right Jack, 1987
Baby Doll Games, 1988
Corpus Christmas, 1989
Past Imperfect, 1991
Fugitive Colors, 1995
Take Out, 2017

Non-series
Novels
Bloody Kin, 1985 (prequel to Judge Deborah Knott series; First "Colleton County" book)
Last Lessons of Summer, 2003

Collections and anthologies

References

External links

1938 births
2021 deaths
20th-century American novelists
20th-century American women writers
21st-century American novelists
21st-century American women writers
American mystery writers
American women novelists
Agatha Award winners
Anthony Award winners
Edgar Award winners
Macavity Award winners
Novelists from North Carolina
People from Johnston County, North Carolina
Women mystery writers
Writers from Greensboro, North Carolina